Ricky Denis García García (born 27 July 1971) is a retired Honduran football player.

Club career
García played for Honduran national league sides Real C.D. España, C.D. Victoria, F.C. Motagua, Atlético Olanchano and Municipal Valencia. In December 2001, when playing for Motagua, García was injured by a policeman after a mass brawl broke out on the pitch in a 2001 Apertura semifinal match against Olimpia. He scored 5 goals in his years with Motagua.

International career
García made his debut for Honduras in a May 1999 friendly match against Haiti and has earned a total of 24 caps, scoring 1 goal. He has represented his country in 7 FIFA World Cup qualification matches and played at the 2001 UNCAF Nations Cup as well as at the 2000 CONCACAF Gold Cup and the 2001 Copa América.

His final international was an October 2001 FIFA World Cup qualification match against Trinidad & Tobago.

International goals
Scores and results list Honduras' goal tally first.

References

External links

1971 births
Living people
People from Puerto Cortés
Association football midfielders
Honduran footballers
Honduras international footballers
2000 CONCACAF Gold Cup players
2001 UNCAF Nations Cup players
2001 Copa América players
Real C.D. España players
C.D. Victoria players
F.C. Motagua players
Liga Nacional de Fútbol Profesional de Honduras players